Christopher James Felgate (born 4 January 1982) is a Zimbabwean triathlete. He competed at the 2008 and 2012 Summer Olympics.

References

External links
 

1982 births
Living people
Sportspeople from Harare
Zimbabwean male triathletes
Olympic triathletes of Zimbabwe
Triathletes at the 2008 Summer Olympics
Triathletes at the 2012 Summer Olympics
White Zimbabwean sportspeople
Alumni of St. John's College (Harare)